The men's shot put event at the 2006 World Junior Championships in Athletics was held in Beijing, China, at Chaoyang Sports Centre on 18 and 19 August.  A 6 kg (junior implement) shot was used.

Medalists

Results

Final
19 August

Qualifications
18 August

Group A

Group B

Participation
According to an unofficial count, 31 athletes from 24 countries participated in the event.

References

Shot put
Shot put at the World Athletics U20 Championships